This is the discography documenting albums and singles released by Cantopop singer Pakho Chau.

Studio albums

Extended plays

Digital release

Live extended plays

Live albums

Compilation albums

Live extended plays

Singles

As lead artist

Soundtrack appearance

Chau, Pakho
Pop music discographies